is a Japanese actress and singer who is affiliated with Sony Music Entertainment Japan through Cast Corporation, until October 8, 2009.

Filmography

TV series

Films

References

External links
 Official website at Sony Music Entertainment Japan 

Japanese actresses
1989 births
Living people
People from Miyazaki Prefecture
Musicians from Miyazaki Prefecture
21st-century Japanese singers
21st-century Japanese women singers